Daniel Alexandrovich, known professionally as Daniel Deluxe, is a Copenhagen-based, Russian electronic music producer. He has released three albums: Corruptor (2016), Instruments of Retribution (2017), and Exile (2020). Deluxe has also composed the scores for video games Desync (2017) and Ghostrunner (2020)

Discography

Albums 
 Corruptor (2016)
 Instruments of Retribution (2017)
 Exile (2020)

Extended play 
 Night Stalker (2014)

Original soundtracks 
 Desync (2017)
 Ghostrunner (2020)

References 

Living people
21st-century Russian male musicians
Synthwave musicians
Year of birth missing (living people)